is a Japanese volleyball player. He plays for the Toray Arrows at club level. He is a member of the Japan men's national volleyball team.

Personal life
He started playing volleyball in 4th grade and eventually played for Chuo University.

On October 1, 2021, he announced his marriage with his college girlfriend.

Career
In 2019, he was given a contract to play for the Toray Arrows as an informal player. He debuted in V.League, 2019–20 V.League Division 1 Men.

In 2020, he was elevated to the Japan men's national volleyball team.

He was a member of Japan's team for the 2022 AVC Cup. Japan won the silver medal,which was the best result Japan got in AVC Cup history.

Individual Awards

Club
2021-22 Japan V.League Division 1 -  Best Digger

References

External links
 Player Profile at V.League
 Player profile at Volleybox.net

Japanese men's volleyball players
Outside hitters
Living people
1997 births